Sir Edward Dundas Holroyd  (25 January 1828 – 5 January 1916) was a judge, active in Australia.


Early life
Holroyd was born in Surrey, England, the second son of Edward Holroyd, senior commissioner of the London bankruptcy court, and his wife Caroline, née Pugsley. E. D. Holroyd was also grandson of Sir George Sowley Holroyd, an English judge. Holroyd was educated at Winchester College, where he twice won the Queen's medal for Latin and English essays. In 1846 went to Trinity College, Cambridge where he graduated B.A. in 1851, M.A. in 1854, and was called to the bar at Gray's Inn in June 1855. Holroyd practised in London and was also a free-lance journalist.

Australia
Holroyd decided to migrate to Australia, and arrived in Melbourne in 1859. Holroyd made a great reputation as a barrister in equity and mining suits, and in 1872 was offered a seat on the bench of the supreme court. He refused this, became a Queen's Counsel in 1879, and on 19 August 1881 became a puisne judge of the Supreme Court of Victoria, a position he held until 9 May 1906.

Holroyd at first took only equity cases, but later proved to be also an excellent judge in the criminal court. He would not allow himself to be ruffled, and it is related that once when he had sentenced a prisoner named Butler for highway robbery, the man, almost foaming at the mouth, heaped curses on the judge. Holroyd calmly said, "Nothing that you can say prisoner can induce me to add one day more to your sentence. I cannot tell you how I despise you." He became the senior judge, and in the absence of Sir John Madden sometimes acted as chief justice.

Life and legacy
Holroyd retired in 1906 and died at his home, Fernacres, in Alma Road, St Kilda, Melbourne, on 5 January 1916. He married in 1862 Anna Maria Hoyles, daughter of Henry Compton, and was survived by two sons and three daughters. He took little part in public discussions, except on the question of federation. He was for some time president of the Imperial Federation League of Victoria, and also of the Athenaeum and Savage Clubs. Holroyd was knighted in 1903. 

Holroyd was below average height and athletic for much of his life. He was a good boxer in his youth, a good tennis player, and even when over 60 thought little of a 20-mile (32 km) walk. Holroyd had a great sense of humour, was a good after-dinner speaker. He was an eminently fair judge, particularly patient with men conducting their own defence, or a barrister struggling with a poor case. His patient noting of witnesses' answers rather cramped the style of barristers who would have preferred to deliver volleys of questions at the witness. His judgments, in clear English and were seldom appealed against.

See also
 Judiciary of Australia
 List of Judges of the Supreme Court of Victoria
 Victorian Bar Association

References

External links
 Supreme Court of Victoria Website

1828 births
1916 deaths
Australian King's Counsel
Judges of the Supreme Court of Victoria
People educated at Winchester College
Alumni of Trinity College, Cambridge
English emigrants to Australia
Colony of Victoria judges